UTC−10:00 is an identifier for a time offset from UTC of −10:00. This time is used in Hawaii, Alaska, French Polynesia, and the Cook Islands.

As standard time (year-round)
Principal cities: Honolulu, Avarua, Papeete, Fa'a'ā

Oceania

Pacific Ocean

Polynesia
France
Society Islands
Leeward Islands
Windward Islands
Tuamotus
Disappointment Islands
Duke of Gloucester Islands
Far East Tuamotu Group
Hao Group
Hikeru Group
King George Islands
Palliser Islands
Raeffsky Islands
Gambier Islands
Outer Gambier Group
Acteon Group
Austral Islands
Tupua'i Islands
Bass Islands
New Zealand
Cook Islands
United States (Hawaii–Aleutian Time Zone)
Hawaii
United States Minor Outlying Islands
Johnston Atoll

As standard time (Northern Hemisphere winter)

North America
United States
Alaska
Aleutian Islands west of 169.30°W
Andreanof Islands
Islands of Four Mountains
Near Islands
Rat Islands

Historical changes
Kiribati
Line Islands – including Kiritimati (Christmas Island) advanced 24 hours (to UTC+14:00) to the eastern hemisphere side of the International Date Line by skipping December 31, 1994.

Samoa – Time in Samoa advanced 24 hours (to UTC+14:00) to the eastern hemisphere side of the International Date Line by skipping December 30, 2011.

References

UTC offsets